Abgarmak-e Sofla or Abgarmak-e Pain, both meaning "Lower Abgarmak", may refer to:
 Ab Garmak-e Pain, Khuzestan, a village in Bagh-e Malek County, Khuzestan Province, Iran
 Ab Garmak-e Sofla, Khuzestan, a village in Shushtar County, Khuzestan Province, Iran
 Abgarmak-e Sofla, Besharat, a village in Besharat District, Aligudarz County, Lorestan Province, Iran